South Side Story is a six-part observational documentary series about the takeover of National Rugby League team, the South Sydney Rabbitohs by actor Russell Crowe and businessman Peter Holmes à Court in 2006.

Cast
 Jack Thompson as Narrator
 Russell Crowe
 Peter Holmes à Court
 George Piggins
 John Sattler
 Jason Taylor
 Alan Jones
 Shane Richardson
 Mario Fenech
 Reni Maitua
 John Sutton
 David Peachey
 David Kidwell
 Jaiman Lowe
 Dean Widders
 Roy Asotasi
 Nathan Merritt
 Nigel Vagana
 Issac Luke
 Joe Williams

Episodes

Series overview

See also

2007 South Sydney Rabbitohs season

References

External links

South Sydney Rabbitohs
Rugby league television shows
Television shows set in New South Wales
English-language television shows
Australian sports television series
2007 Australian television series debuts
2007 Australian television series endings
Australian Broadcasting Corporation original programming
2000s Australian documentary television series
Documentary television series about sports
Television series by Beyond Television Productions